Dawid Szymonowicz (born 7 July 1995) is a Polish professional footballer who plays for Ekstraklasa side Warta Poznań.

Honours
Cracovia
Polish Super Cup: 2020

References

External links
 
 
 

Polish footballers
Polish expatriate footballers
Poland youth international footballers
1995 births
Living people
OKS Stomil Olsztyn players
Jagiellonia Białystok players
FC ViOn Zlaté Moravce players
Bruk-Bet Termalica Nieciecza players
Raków Częstochowa players
MKS Cracovia (football) players
Warta Poznań players
Slovak Super Liga players
Ekstraklasa players
I liga players
People from Lidzbark Warmiński
Association football midfielders
Expatriate footballers in Slovakia
Polish expatriate sportspeople in Slovakia